The 1st Austrian Grand Prix was a motor race, run to Formula One rules, held on 1 September 1963 at the Zeltweg Airfield. The race was run over 80 laps of the circuit, and was won by Australian driver Jack Brabham in a Brabham BT3, finishing a massive five laps ahead of the next finisher. Many competitors retired after the rough surface of the track caused mechanical failures.

This race marked the Formula One debut of 1970 World Champion Jochen Rindt, and also the only Formula One appearance of his compatriot Kurt Bardi-Barry, who was killed in a road accident in February 1964.

Results

References
 "The Formula One Record Book", John Thompson, 1974.

Austrian Grand Prix
Austrian Grand Prix
Grand Prix